Gaston Charles Vuillier (7 October 1845, Perpignan – 2 February 1915, Gimel-les-Cascades) was a French painter, designer, traveller and ethnographer. He was employed by many of the major  periodicals and journals of the time; including Le Tour du monde and Le Monde illustré.

Biography 
His father, Paul Vuillier, was a blacksmith from Aude, where he spent most of his childhood. Later, he attended a boarding school in Perpignan.

In 1878, having just presented his first exhibition at the Salon, he applied for a position at the Maison Hachette, where he interviewed with Édouard Charton and was hired as an illustrator for their magazines. During his many travels throughout Europe, on his own as well as on assignments, he became acquainted with Archduke Ludwig Salvator of Austria, a noted researcher of the Mediterranean region. This resulted in his working with the folklorist, Giuseppe Pitré. These encounters created a lifelong interest in ethnography. For many years after his death, he would be better known for his work in that field than as an artist.

In 1892, fascinated by the natural scenery there, he settled in Gimel-les-Cascades, and would later be a staunch advocate for protecting the waterfalls that gave the area its name. He also acted as a landscape designer, adorning the area with walkways, observation sites, gates and trees. Ultimately, despite opposition from local business interests, he was successful in preventing the construction of a dam upriver.

He also created large, thoroughly researched works on Dance Through the Ages (1898) and Pleasures and Games (1900). In his final years, he focused on illustrating classics by Prosper Mérimée, Pierre Louys and François-René de Chateaubriand, among others.

Selected works

References

Further reading 
 Daniel Fabre and Anna Iuso, Gaston Vuillier ou le trait du voyageur, Garae Hesiode, 2002

External links

19th-century French painters
French illustrators
French ethnographers
French conservationists
People from Perpignan
1845 births
1915 deaths
20th-century French painters